Islam Hassan Seraj (born 7 March 1989) is a Saudi professional football player who plays for Al-Hejaz as a forward.

Honours
Al-Wehda
Saudi First Division Runner-up: 2011-12

Al-Ahli
Saudi Professional League: 2015-16
King Cup: 2016
Saudi Super Cup: 2016

References

External links 

1989 births
Living people
Al-Ahli Saudi FC players
Al-Wehda Club (Mecca) players
Ettifaq FC players
Al-Faisaly FC players
Jeddah Club players
Ohod Club players
Damac FC players
Al-Shoulla FC players
Al-Arabi SC (Saudi Arabia) players
Al-Zulfi FC players
Al-Jubail Club players
Al-Hejaz Club players
Saudi Arabian footballers
Sportspeople from Jeddah
Association football forwards
Saudi First Division League players
Saudi Professional League players
Saudi Second Division players
Saudi Third Division players
21st-century Saudi Arabian people